Tempa is a village in Hiiu County in Estonia. It was the administrative centre of Pühalepa Parish.

References

 

Villages in Hiiu County